Vaagdevi Engineering College is an engineering college was established in 2008 and is sponsored by Viswambhara educational society. The campus occupies 10 acres. It is situated on the Khammam highway about 10 km from Warangal railway station.

Departments
 Department of Computer Science Engineering
 Department of Electronics and Communication Engineering
 Department of Electrical and Electronics Engineering
 Department of MBA

References

External links 
 

Universities and colleges in Andhra Pradesh
Engineering universities and colleges in India
2008 establishments in Andhra Pradesh